The Smith-Larsen House, at 280 E. Center St. in Centerville, Utah, was listed on the National Register of Historic Places in 1997.

It is a one-and-a-half-story brick house built with Victorian style around 1886.  It was modified from Victorian style into a bungalow around 1911, including by addition of a front porch, a front dormer with a Palladian window, shingles on its upper story, and double-hung windows.

References

National Register of Historic Places in Davis County, Utah
Victorian architecture in Utah
Houses completed in 1886